This is a list of Iraq international footballers, comprising players to have represented the Iraq national football team since its formation in 1957.

Notes

References

 
Association football player non-biographical articles